Hiles is the name of some places in the U.S. state of Wisconsin:
Hiles, Forest County, Wisconsin, a town
Hiles (community), Wisconsin, an unincorporated community in Forest County
Hiles, Wood County, Wisconsin, a town